269 (West Riding) Battery Royal Artillery is part of 101st (Northumbrian) Regiment Royal Artillery, an artillery regiment of the British Army.

History
The battery was formed as 269 (West Riding) Observation Post Battery Royal Artillery (Volunteers) in April 1975 at Leeds from a cadre of the West Riding Regiment RA (Territorials). Its role was to provide observation teams to support 1st Armoured Division and 2nd Armoured Division in Germany. In 1989 the battery re-roled to the 105 mm light gun and in 1993 it joined 19th Regiment Royal Artillery, a regular regiment in 24 Airmobile Brigade. In July 1999 it re-roled as an air defence battery equipped with the Rapier surface-to-air missile system within 106th (Yeomanry) Regiment Royal Artillery. In 2006 it transferred to 101st (Northumbrian) Regiment Royal Artillery where it was given a Surveillance and Target Acquisition role. Under Army 2020, it is re-roling to the M270 Multiple Launch Rocket System.

The unit is based in Carlton Barracks, Leeds.

References

Publications
 Litchfield, Norman E H, 1992. The Territorial Artillery 1908-1988, The Sherwood Press, Nottingham. 

Royal Artillery batteries
Military units and formations in the West Riding of Yorkshire